Discovery Science is a Southeast Asia pay television channel (excluding Malaysia, formerly including Malaysia) owned by Discovery Asia-Pacific. The channel replaced Discovery Sci-Trek. Discovery Science rebranded along with Travel Channel in Southeast Asia from 1 September 2021. Starting 15 September 2021, Astro will move the channel number of Discovery Science from 554 to 557. It is the first Learning channels to ceased broadcasting on Astro on 1 October 2021 due to a decision made following review of the channel performance and replaced by BBC Earth on 15 September 2021. Discovery Science will launch in Indonesia, on TransVision from 1 October 2021.

A separate feed is run for India and other South Asian countries with timeshifted schedule and old 2011 branding.

Programming

 Bad Universe
 Best Of G.I. Factory
 Bone Detectives
 Catalyst
 Dark Matters: Twisted But True
 Deadliest Tech
 The Detonators
 Edge Of War
 Extreme Engineering
 Factory Made
 How Do They Do It?
 How It's Made?
 How Tech Work
 Industrial Revelations: Best Of British Engineering
 Junkies
 Junkyard Wars
 Massive Machines
 Mega Builders
 Mega Moves
 Moon Machines
 The New Inventors
 Oddities
 Prophets of Science Fiction
 SciTrek
 Some Assembly Required
 Stephen Hawking 2: The Grand Design
 Through The Wormhole With Morgan Freeman
 Triggers: Weapons That Changed The World
 Weaponizers
 Weaponology
 Weird Connections
 What You Can't See

Current feeds
 
China 
 
Hong Kong 
 
This channel was available on Cable TV Hong Kong, NowTV China and myTV Hong Kong. 
 
Taiwan 
 
Only available on CHT MOD. 
 
Macau 
 
Only available on Macau Cable TV. 
 
Singapore
 
Only available on Singtel TV. Formerly available on StarHub TV
 
Philippines
 
Only Available on G Sat Channel 24. 
 
Indonesia
 
From 1 October 2021, will launch in Indonesia, on TransVision.
 
India
 
Available on In Digital.

Defunct feeds
 
Malaysia 
 
This channel was only available on Astro via channel 554. On 15 September 2021, it was moved from channel 554 to 557. The Malaysian feed of Discovery Science closed on 1 October 2021, 30 daSy after Discovery Science rebranded in Southeast Asia due to bad reviews of  channel performance and was replaced by BBC Earth on channel 554, which launched on 15 September 2021.

See also
 Discovery Science (TV channel)
 Science Channel

References

Asia
Discovery Science Asia
Television channels and stations established in 2003